Hookers for Hillary was a semi-formal organization of Nevada-based sex workers who supported Hillary Clinton's candidacy in the 2016 United States presidential election. The group, which claimed a membership of 500 prostitutes, was not registered with the Federal Elections Commission as a political action committee and did not, therefore, directly provide political donations. Its members, instead, evangelized support of Clinton to their clients and, in some instances, reportedly offered enhanced sexual services to existing customers in exchange for direct donations to Clinton's presidential campaign.

The organization centered its support of Clinton on her health care policy proposals and foreign policy experience. According to a 2015 press release from the group, the perceived benefits of a Clinton foreign policy would include avoiding "a repeat of the Secret Service's Colombian prostitution scandal by making sure that her detail 'buys American'". Some of its members had been previously affiliated with Pimpin' for Paul, an organization of Nevada-based prostitutes that campaigned for Ron Paul in the 2008 United States presidential election and 2012 United States presidential election.

Members of the group were largely drawn from brothels owned by Nevada prostitution mogul and Libertarian Party member Dennis Hof, and the organization has been described as his "brainchild". Hof said that one of his motivations was that he wanted his workers to get involved in politics, with some of them starting Hookers for Hillary and others forming the rival organization Tarts for Trump. While stopping short of calling Hookers for Hillary a publicity stunt, Hof indicated that the group's existence helped build awareness for his businesses. Nonetheless, despite characterizations of the group as a public relations ploy designed to drive media coverage of Hof's brothels, a reporter for The Guardian who interviewed Hookers for Hillary members described their support for Clinton as genuine.

See also
 Hillary Clinton presidential campaign, 2016
 JC's Girls
 Prostitution in Nevada

References

External links
 

Hillary Clinton 2016 presidential campaign
Lobbying organizations in the United States
Politics of Nevada
Prostitution in Nevada
Publicity stunts